Dženis Beganović (born 23 March 1996) is a Bosnian professional footballer who plays as a forward for Bosnian Premier League club Željezničar.

Club career

Željezničar
Born in Sarajevo, Beganović started off his career in the youth team of hometown club Željezničar in 2006. In 2014, he debuted for the first team of Željezničar as a 18 year old.

On 16 July 2015, in a 2015–16 UEFA Europa League second qualifying round match against Ferencvárosi, Beganović scored in the 90th minute for Željezničar (Željezničar won 1–0 in Hungary, while in Sarajevo, they won 2–0 and qualified for the third round), securing them qualification to the third qualifying round.

In January 2017, Beganović was loaned out to Metalleghe-BSI for the remainder of the 2016–17 Bosnian Premier League season.

On 18 December 2017, after 3 years playing for the club, he left Željezničar.

Kom
On 21 February 2018, Beganović signed with Montenegrin First League club Kom. On 7 June 2018, not even four months after joining Kom, he left the club.

Znojmo
One month after leaving Kom, in July 2018, Beganović joined Czech 2. Liga club Znojmo. He made his league debut for Znojmo on 29 July 2018 against Hradec Králové in a 2–1 away loss.

He scored his first goal for Znojmo on 12 April 2019, in a 1–1 home league draw against Vlašim.

Tuzla City
On 28 June 2019, after two years Beganović came back to Bosnia and Herzegovina and signed a three year contract with Tuzla City. He made his official debut for Tuzla City on 10 August 2019, in a 0–1 away league win against Mladost Doboj Kakanj. Beganović scored his first goal for Tuzla City in a 1–0 home league win against Čelik Zenica on 23 November 2019.

Sloboda Tuzla
On 19 August 2020, Beganović signed a contract with Tuzla City's city rivals Sloboda. He made his official debut for Sloboda in a league loss against Zrinjski Mostar on 22 August 2020. Beganović scored his first goal for the club on 29 August 2020, in a league win against Široki Brijeg.

Return to Željezničar
On 21 June 2022, Beganović returned to Željezničar. He made his second debut for Željezničar on 16 July 2022, in a 1–1 home draw against Leotar. On 19 October 2022, Beganović scored his first goal in the 2022–23 season in a Bosnian Cup game against Budućnost Banovići.

International career
Beganović played for both the Bosnia and Herzegovina U19 and U21 national teams.

Career statistics

Club

References

External links
Dženis Beganović at Sofascore

1996 births
Living people
Footballers from Sarajevo
Association football forwards
Bosnia and Herzegovina footballers
Bosnia and Herzegovina youth international footballers
Bosnia and Herzegovina under-21 international footballers
FK Željezničar Sarajevo players
NK Metalleghe-BSI players
FK Kom players
1. SC Znojmo players
FK Tuzla City players
FK Sloboda Tuzla players
Premier League of Bosnia and Herzegovina players
Montenegrin First League players
Czech National Football League players
Bosnia and Herzegovina expatriate footballers
Expatriate footballers in Montenegro
Bosnia and Herzegovina expatriate sportspeople in Montenegro
Expatriate footballers in the Czech Republic
Bosnia and Herzegovina expatriate sportspeople in the Czech Republic